UniAdmissions is an education consultancy providing help to students applying to Oxbridge and Medical Schools.

History 
The company was founded in 2013 by Rohan Agarwal and David Salt - two medical graduates from Cambridge University and incorporated with companies house England and Wales as Medox Tutors Ltd in June 2015.

Services 
The company provides support with students’ application, personal statement, admissions tests and interviews.

The tutors employed by UniAdmissions offer advice for most subjects. A large number of them are themselves graduates from universities in the Russell Group.
The company offers an array of intensive courses to prepare for UKCAT, BMAT, LNAT, TSA, Interviews. The current UKCAT and BMAT Intensive course is judged the best available course for 2016 by The UKCAT Blog.

The company claims to have a 77% medical success rate, however this is not independently verified.

Publications 
A series of 65 books have been published by UniAdmissions, to include titles such as: The Ultimate UKCAT Guide: 1250 Practice questions, David Salt & Rohan Agarwal, RAR Medical Services, 2017. 
These have received mixed reviews- the BMAT, TSA and LNAT books have been received well with many praising the high quality of questions.  Contrastingly, there have also been some negative comments e.g. explanations not being clear enough....

UniAdmissions also regularly contributes to national newspapers such as The Independent and Huffington Post - How to get into Oxbridge: 5 ways to prepare for an Oxford and Cambridge University admissions test and Applying to medical school: 5 ways to successfully get through the process

Similar Services 
A number of other companies are providing similar services such as Oxford Tutors, Cambridge Tutors, Insight Education, or Gabbitas Education Consultants. This kind of coaching  and support to enter high ranking universities has taken off in the UK in the last 10 years (1 in 6 Oxbridge applicants are said to use these services  ) but it had been already in use in the United States for many decades with consultants like Kaplan, who have helped over 3 million students since 1938.

Criticisms 
The validity of such services is often questioned and University Admissions Services often say that external coaching is not necessary. Some colleges also state that private consultancies "don't have access to any ‘insider information' that isn't available on the Cambridge website".

References 

Companies based in Broxbourne
Educational organisations based in England